Meritastis is a genus of moths belonging to the subfamily Tortricinae of the family Tortricidae.

Species
Meritastis ferrea (Meyrick, 1910)
Meritastis illucida (Meyrick, 1910)
Meritastis laganodes (Meyrick, 1910)
Meritastis lythrodana (Meyrick, 1881)
Meritastis piperata (Meyrick, 1910)
Meritastis polygraphana (Walker, 1863)
Meritastis psarodes (Meyrick, 1910)
Meritastis pyrosemana (Meyrick, 1881)
Meritastis trissochorda (Turner, 1916)
Meritastis umbrosa Meyrick, 1910
Meritastis ursina (Meyrick, 1910)

See also
List of Tortricidae genera

References

External links
tortricidae.com

Epitymbiini
Tortricidae genera